Cadolzburg station is a railway station in the municipality of Cadolzburg, located in the Fürth district in Bavaria, Germany.

References

Railway stations in Bavaria
Buildings and structures in Fürth (district)